Umeko (written: 梅子 lit. "plum tree, child", or ウメ子) is a feminine Japanese given name. Notable people with the name include:

, Japanese musician
, Japanese educator

Fictional characters
, a character in the visual novel Maji de Watashi ni Koi Shinasai!
Umeko / Ninjara, a character in the Teenage Mutant Ninja Turtles series

Japanese feminine given names